The 2005–06 season was Manchester City Football Club's fourth consecutive season playing in the Premier League, the top division of English football, and its ninth season since the Premier League was first created with Manchester City as one of its original 22 founding member clubs.  Overall, it was the team's 114th season playing in a division of English football, most of which have been spent in the top flight.

Season review

Team kit 
For this season the shirt sponsor for all of the club's kits continued to be the previous season's sponsor, Thomas Cook, while the team kits were produced by the previous season's supplier, Reebok.

Historical league performance 
Prior to this season, the history of Manchester City's performance in the English football league hierarchy since the creation of the Premier League in 1992 is summarised by the following timeline chart – which commences with the last season (1991–92) of the old Football League First Division (from which the Premier League was formed).

Friendly games

Pre-season

Premier League Asia Trophy

Thomas Cook Trophy

Competitive games

Premier League

Position in final standings

Results summary

Points breakdown 

Points at home: 29 
Points away from home: 14 

Points against "Big Four" teams: 4 
Points against promoted teams: 9

6 points: Aston Villa, Birmingham City, Charlton Athletic, Sunderland
4 points: Manchester United
3 points: Everton, Newcastle United, Portsmouth, West Ham United
1 point: Blackburn Rovers, Middlesbrough, West Bromwich Albion
0 points: Arsenal, Bolton Wanderers, Chelsea, Fulham, Liverpool,
Tottenham Hotspur, Wigan Athletic

Biggest & smallest 
Biggest home wins: 4–1 vs. Birmingham City, 17 December 2005 
3–0 vs. Newcastle United, 1 February 2006 
Biggest home defeats: 1–3 vs. Arsenal, 4 May 2006 
0–2 vs. Tottenham Hotspur, 4 January 2006 
Biggest away win: 2–5 vs. Charlton Athletic, 4 December 2005 
Biggest away defeats: 2–0 vs. West Bromwich Albion, 10 December 2005 
& vs. Bolton Wanderers, 21 January 2006 & vs. Chelsea, 25 March 2006  
& vs. Blackburn Rovers, 7 May 2006 

Biggest home attendance: 47,192 vs. Manchester United, 14 January 2006 
Smallest home attendance: 40,256 vs. Middlesbrough, 2 April 2006 
Biggest away attendance: 67,839 vs. Manchester United, 10 September 2005 
Smallest away attendance: 19,556 vs. Portsmouth, 11 March 2006

Results by round

Individual match reports

League Cup

FA Cup

First-team squad

Left club during season

Goal scorers

All competitions

Premier League

League Cup

FA Cup 

Information current as of 7 May 2006 (end of season)

Transfers and loans

Transfers in

Transfers out

Loans in

Loans out

References 

Manchester City F.C. seasons
Manchester City
Articles which contain graphical timelines